Thomas Ernst (born 23 December 1967) is a German former professional footballer who played as a goalkeeper.

Career 
Ernst was born in Wiesbaden, Hesse. He started playing professionally with Eintracht Frankfurt. At the Hessian club, he could only amass five Bundesliga appearances in seven years combined, being barred by legendary Uli Stein. In 1994, he moved clubs but stayed in the city, joining FSV Frankfurt in the second division.

After one season, Ernst joined VfL Bochum also in level two, only appearing twice in his first two seasons combined. His best individual year happened in 1998–99, when he appeared in 32 league games, but the North Rhine-Westphalia side suffered top flight relegation, as second from bottom.

From 2000 to 2006, Ernst remained in the top division, with VfB Stuttgart and 1. FC Kaiserslautern, but again appeared almost exclusively as a backup, until his retirement at the age of 38. In 19 professional seasons, he appeared in 152 league games, 106 of those in the first division.

Ernst moved into managing immediately after retiring, working as a goalkeeper coach with Germany women's national team. The following year, he had his first head coach experience, with former club FSV Frankfurt, and returned to Bochum in 2008, as director of football.

Career statistics

Honours
VfB Stuttgart
UEFA Intertoto Cup: 2002

References

External links
 

Living people
1967 births
Sportspeople from Wiesbaden
German footballers
Association football goalkeepers
Bundesliga players
2. Bundesliga players
FV Biebrich players
Eintracht Frankfurt players
Eintracht Frankfurt II players
FSV Frankfurt players
VfL Bochum players
VfB Stuttgart players
1. FC Kaiserslautern players
1. FC Kaiserslautern II players
German football managers
Footballers from Hesse